The Mitsero murders were a series of murders on the island of Cyprus committed by 35-year-old Cypriot Army officer Nikos Metaxas, also known as Orestis, taking place between September 2016 and August 2018. Five of his seven victims were female foreigners (from Nepal, the Philippines, and Romania) he had met on the online dating site Badoo. The remaining two victims were young children, and were the daughters of two of the women he had killed.

The case came to public attention in April 2019 when unusually heavy floods brought the body of the first victim, Mary Rose Tiburcio, to the top of a mine shaft near Mitsero, where it was discovered by a German tourist. Another body was discovered in a well at a firing range by Orounta. Three of the victims were stuffed into suitcases and disposed of in the Red Lake near Mitsero, so named because the toxic chemicals present in the lake from nearby mining operations gave it a red hue. The latest body, that of Tiburcio's six-year-old daughter Sierra, was found in Lake Memi near Xyliatos in June.

During his apprehension, Metaxas reportedly attempted to swallow a SIM card in front of police before they stopped him. After he was named as a suspect, multiple women came forward to accuse him of crimes such as rape, and he was also formally accused of evidence tampering and obstruction of justice; however, critical evidence for these charges was believed to have been destroyed or lost. Metaxas told investigators that he had strangled two of his victims and their daughters because he suspected that the women were planning to "pimp out" their daughters, and he wanted to punish the women and "free" the children. He pleaded guilty on 24 June and received seven life sentences, the biggest sentence ever handed down in Cyprus.

The murders sparked criticism towards the negligence and incompetence of the island's police force, as many of the victims had been reported missing by relatives or friends as far back as September 2016, only to be met with indifference and a lack of progress in the investigationsPresident Nicos Anastasiades condemned the authorities' "sheer negligence and inefficiency", adding his belief that their actions were "definitely not guided by any racist motives". In the midst of the case, Justice Minister Ionas Nicolaou resigned and police chief Zacharias Chrysostomou was fired. As of July 2019, an investigation into the police's handling of the reports is underway. That same month, Cypriot MPs began meetings to address the fact that 37 women had been killed in Cyprus between 2000 and 2019.

Cypriot businessman Sir Stelios Haji-Ioannou, founder of British airline easyJet, announced that he would donate €10,000 to each of the closest relatives of each victim. As of July 2019, he has been unable to contact the relatives of two of the victims, and has said that he will donate the additional sums of €10,000 each to Metaxas' eight-year-old son and six-year-old daughter for their education in the meantime.

Victims
Metaxas confessed to the murders of five women and two children, all foreigners. All of the adults were migrant workers. At least four bodies have been dumped in lakes, and two were found in an abandoned mine. 36-year-old Romanian woman Livia Florentina Bunea and her eight-year-old daughter Elena, both killed in September 2016, are thought to have been the first victims. Two decomposed bodies, which the police believe to be those of Bunea and her daughter, were found stuffed into suitcases and dumped in a lake. A third suitcase which is believed to contain the body of Maricar Valtez Arquiola, a 31-year-old Filipino woman who disappeared in December 2017, has yet to be found. Filipina Mary Rose Tiburcio, a 38-year-old Filipino migrant worker, was the last woman killed but the first body found; her body was discovered in an abandoned mine on 14 April 2019 by a German tourist.

Three bodies have been found naked, bound, and wrapped in sheets. The police believe them to be the bodies of two Filipino migrant workers and possibly that of a Nepalese woman, whose body was found at an army shooting range by investigators. The body of six-year-old Filipino girl Sierra Graze Seucalliuc was found in a lake on 12 June 2019. She went missing with her mother, Mary Rose Seucalliuc, in May 2018.

Nikos Metaxas
Nikos Metaxas (born in 1984) is a Greek Cypriot former army officer who confessed to the Mitsero murders. He has been sentenced by the Supreme Court of Cyprus to seven life sentences.

Aftermath 
Cypriot authorities faced accusations of not fully investigating the reports when the women were first reported missing, which later resulted in the sacking of the country's police chief, Zacharias Chrysostomou, as well as the resignation of justice minister, Ionas Nicolaou.

References

2019 in Cyprus
2010s in Cyprus
2010s murders in Cyprus
Murder in Cyprus
History of women in Cyprus